John Charles Meyer is an American actor and film producer.

Career
He recurred as Jesus in the second season of Mom, and has appeared in guest star roles in Hawaii Five-0, NCIS, Anger Management, Mike & Molly, and others. He played young Giuseppe Salvatore in the seventh season of The Vampire Diaries. His film roles include The Taqwacores and The Millennium Bug,

John produced the comedy feature Dave Made a Maze, which opened in theaters across the U.S. and Canada on August 18, 2017.

Filmography

Film

Television

References

External links
 

American male actors
Living people
Year of birth missing (living people)